Julian Lüttmann (born 19 April 1982) is a German former footballer who played as a striker.

Career
Lüttmann was born in Rheine. He made his debut on the professional league level in the 2. Bundesliga for Rot-Weiß Oberhausen on 17 August 2008, when he came on as a substitute in the 65th minute in a game against TuS Koblenz

After retiring in September 2014, Lüttmann worked as sports director for his former club VfB Oldenburg until the summer 2015.

Honours
 Top scorer in the Oberliga Westfalen: 2006–07 (24 goals)

References

External links
 

1982 births
Living people
Association football forwards
German footballers
SC Preußen Münster players
Holstein Kiel players
Sportfreunde Lotte players
Rot-Weiß Oberhausen players
SV Sandhausen players
FC Rot-Weiß Erfurt players
VfB Oldenburg players
SSV Jeddeloh players
2. Bundesliga players
3. Liga players
People from Rheine
Sportspeople from Münster (region)
Footballers from North Rhine-Westphalia
FC Eintracht Rheine players